Leonard Bredol (born 1 August 2000) is a German professional footballer who plays for Blau-Weiß Lohne.

References

Living people
2000 births
Association football defenders
German footballers
SV Meppen players
3. Liga players